Andreea Mitu was the defending champion but chose not to participate.

Ana Konjuh won the title, defeating Nigina Abduraimova in the final, 2–6, 6–0, 7–6(7–2).

Seeds

Draw

Finals

Top half

Bottom half

References

External Links
Main Draw

Slovak Open - Singles